George Cuthill is a former association football player who represented New Zealand at international level.

Cuthill played two official A-international matches for New Zealand in 1958, the first a 2–3 loss against trans-Tasman neighbours Australia on 16 August 1958, the second a 5–1 win over New Caledonia on 7 September that same year, Cuthill amongst the goalscorers that day.

References 

Living people
New Zealand association footballers
New Zealand international footballers
1934 births
Association football inside forwards